Stefan Lindemann (born 30 September 1980) is a German retired figure skater. He is the 2004 World bronze medalist, 2005 European bronze medalist, 2000 World Junior champion, and a seven-time (2000, 2002, 2004–2007, 2010) German national champion.

Career
Stefan Lindeman started skating at age 4 in Erfurt at the local skating club. At age 12 he wanted to play ice hockey, but his mother kept him in figure skating. His coach was Ilona Schindler. After finishing his school he was sponsored by the Bundeswehr (German Army).

In 1995, at age 14, Lindemann made his first successful appearance in the international figure skating scene by placing fourth at the junior world championships. In 1996 he placed 12th at the German nationals. He placed fourth in the same event in 1997, second in 1999, and first in 2000, becoming the German champion. In 2000, he won the World Junior Championships. This was the first such title for the German Figure Skating Organisation, Deutsche Eislauf-Union.

At the 2000 Sparkassen Cup, Lindemann injured his knee when he fell on a triple Axel in the short program. He tore a ligament in his right knee and pulled a muscle in his talocalcanean joint.

In 2004, Lindemann became German champion and won the bronze medal at the World Championships in Dortmund. In 2005, he won the bronze medal at the European Championships. At Worlds, he missed all his jumps in the short program but pulled up to 12th after a strong performance in the free program.

He is the most successful German figure skater in the men's single event since Norbert Schramm, who won silver in both 1982 and 1983 at the World championships.

Lindemann withdrew from the 2006-2007 Grand Prix series due to injury.

He returned to skating in 2009 and won the German title. He then placed 9th at the 2010 European Championship and represented Germany at the Vancouver 2010 Olympics. In the Olympics he scored 68.50 in the short program, placing 17th. In the long program he received a score of 103.48, placing 23rd in the long program. Overall he received 171.98. Overall results he placed 22nd at the Vancouver 2010 Olympics.

Lindemann retired from competitive skating right after the Olympics in 2010. He has become a coach, working in Berlin, and remains in the German army.

Programs

Competitive highlights
GP: Grand Prix; JGP: Junior Grand Prix

1997–2010

1993–1997

References

External links 

 
 Official site 
 Official fansite at AbsoluteSkating

1980 births
Living people
German male single skaters
Figure skaters at the 2006 Winter Olympics
Olympic figure skaters of Germany
Sportspeople from Erfurt
Figure skaters at the 2010 Winter Olympics
World Figure Skating Championships medalists
European Figure Skating Championships medalists
World Junior Figure Skating Championships medalists